Kentwood is a rural town in Tangipahoa Parish, Louisiana, United States, near the Mississippi state line. The population was 2,198 at the 2010 census. It is part of the Hammond Micropolitan Statistical Area. Kentwood is best known as the hometown of singer Britney Spears.

History
This rural town was founded by Amos Kent in 1893.

On August 30, 2012, pressure on a dam on the Tangipahoa River to the north of the town as a result of Hurricane Isaac led to Louisiana Governor Bobby Jindal calling for a mandatory evacuation of the town due to fears of large-scale flooding from Lake Tangipahoa. The evacuation order was later rescinded and the dam held.

Geography

Demographics

2020 census

As of the 2020 United States census, there were 2,145 people, 771 households, and 421 families residing in the town.

2000 census
At the 2000 census there were 2,205 people, 850 households, and 559 families in the town. The racial makeup of the town was 64.85% African American, 34.42% White, 0.09% Native American, 0.09% Asian, 0.14% from other races, and 0.41% from two or more races. Hispanic or Latino of any race were 0.68%.

Of the 850 households, 30.7% had children under the age of 18 living with them, 32.6% were married couples living together, 28.2% had a female householder with no husband present, and 34.2% were non-families. 29.9% of households were one person and 15.8% were one person aged 65 or older. The average household size was 2.59 and the average family size was 3.28.

The age distribution was 29.9% under the age of 18, 11.5% from 18 to 24, 23.5% from 25 to 44, 20.4% from 45 to 64, and 14.7% 65 or older. The median age was 34 years. For every 100 females, there were 80.1 males. For every 100 females age 18 and over, there were 73.7 males.

The median household income was $17,297 and the median family income was $23,889. Males had a median income of $25,583 versus $15,200 for females. The per capita income for the town was $11,171. About 29.5% of families and 37.6% of the population were below the poverty line, including 49.2% of those under age 18 and 32.5% of those age 65 or over.

Education
Tangipahoa Parish School Board operates public schools:
Kentwood High Magnet School (7-12)
O. W. Dillon Memorial Elementary School (K-6)
Chesbrough Elementary (K-5)
Spring Creek Elementary (K-5)
Jewel M. Sumner Middle and High School

Notable people
Roger Ballard, country music singer-songwriter
Stacy Head (born 1969), New Orleans elected official born in nearby Greensburg but associated with Kentwood
Michael "Mike" Jackson (1969–2017), former National Football League wide receiver
Little Brother Montgomery (1906–85), jazz pianist
Paul Gayten (1920-1991), R&B pianist, songwriter, record producer
Clay Shaw (1913–74), New Orleans businessman and the only person prosecuted in connection with the assassination of President John F. Kennedy. He was acquitted.
Ann Alexander Smith, Louisiana educator
Jackie Smith (born 1940), National Football League tight end and member of the Pro Football Hall of Fame
Britney Spears (born 1981), singer, songwriter, dancer, and actress
Jamie Lynn Spears (born 1991), actress and singer
Collis Temple (born 1952), first African-American athlete at Louisiana State University

See also
 Camp Moore - a Confederate training base near Kentwood, now a museum.

References

Populated places established in 1893
Towns in Louisiana
Towns in Tangipahoa Parish, Louisiana